János Szépe (born 15 March 1996) is a Slovak football defender who plays for Nemzeti Bajnokság I club MTK. He is ethnic Hungarian.

Club career
He made his professional Fortuna Liga debut for FC DAC 1904 Dunajská Streda against MFK Ružomberok on 20 May 2016.

On 12 January 2022, Szépe joined MTK.

Career statistics
.

References

External links
 
 Eurofotbal profile
 Futbalnet profile

1996 births
People from Galanta
Sportspeople from the Trnava Region
Hungarians in Slovakia
Living people
Slovak footballers
Association football defenders
FC DAC 1904 Dunajská Streda players
Mosonmagyaróvári TE 1904 footballers
Zalaegerszegi TE players
Mezőkövesdi SE footballers
MTK Budapest FC players
Slovak Super Liga players
Nemzeti Bajnokság I players
Nemzeti Bajnokság II players
Slovak expatriate footballers
Expatriate footballers in Hungary
Slovak expatriate sportspeople in Hungary